Rimavská Sobota District (okres Rimavská Sobota) is a district in the Banská Bystrica Region of central Slovakia.

The district was first established in 1923 and from 1996 exists in its present borders. The population density is approximately half of Slovakia average. The seat is its biggest town Rimavská Sobota. District north is more industrial, while district south more agricultural area. Rimavská Sobota District consists of 107 municipalities, from which Rimavská Sobota, Hnúšťa and Tisovec have the town status.

Municipalities
Abovce
Babinec
Barca
Bátka
Belín
Blhovce
Bottovo
Budikovany
Cakov
Čerenčany
Chanava
Chrámec
Čierny Potok
Číž
Dolné Zahorany
Dražice
Drienčany
Drňa
Dubno
Dubovec
Dulovo
Figa
Gemerček
Gemerské Dechtáre
Gemerské Michalovce
Gemerský Jablonec
Gortva
Hajnáčka
Hnúšťa
Hodejov
Hodejovec
Horné Zahorany
Hostice
Hostišovce
Hrachovo
Hrušovo
Hubovo
Husiná
Ivanice
Janice
Jesenské
Jestice
Kaloša
Kesovce
Klenovec
Kociha
Konrádovce
Kráľ
Kraskovo
Krokava
Kružno
Kyjatice
Lehota nad Rimavicou
Lenartovce
Lenka
Lipovec
Lukovištia
Martinová
Neporadza
Nižný Skálnik
Nová Bašta
Orávka
Ožďany
Padarovce
Pavlovce
Petrovce
Poproč
Potok
Radnovce
Rakytník
Ratkovská Lehota
Ratkovská Suchá
Riečka
Rimavská Baňa
Rimavská Seč
Rimavská Sobota
Rimavské Brezovo
Rimavské Janovce
Rimavské Zalužany
Rovné
Rumince
Slizké
Stará Bašta
Stránska
Studená
Sútor
Šimonovce
Širkovce
Španie Pole
Štrkovec
Tachty
Teplý Vrch
Tisovec
Tomášovce
Uzovská Panica
Valice
Včelince
Večelkov
Veľké Teriakovce
Veľký Blh
Vieska nad Blhom
Vlkyňa
Vyšné Valice
Vyšný Skálnik
Zacharovce
Zádor
Žíp

Districts of Slovakia
Geography of Banská Bystrica Region